The October Crisis was a kidnapping in October 1970 in the province of Quebec in Canada.

October Crisis may also refer to:
 Cuban Missile Crisis or October Crisis of 1962

See also
October Revolution (disambiguation)